A five-part referendum was held in the Cook Islands on 24 March 1994. Voters were consulted on retaining the country's name, flag and national anthem and seats in parliament for overseas Cook Islanders, as well as whether the term of Parliament should be three, four or five years.

Voters voted in favour of retaining the islands' name, national anthem, flag and overseas seats in Parliament, and opted for a five-year term of parliament.

Results

Retention of the country's name

Retention of the national anthem

Retention of the national flag

Retention of overseas seats in Parliament

Parliamentary term

References

1994 in the Cook Islands
1994 referendums
Referendums in the Cook Islands
March 1994 events in Oceania
1994